The Anna University Satellite, or ANUSAT was an Indian student research microsatellite designed, developed and integrated at Aerospace Engineering, Madras Institute of Technology (MIT), Chromepet, Anna University. Students and faculty members of Madras Institute of Technology and College of Engineering, Guindy were involved in the design of ANUSAT. The project director of the ANUSAT was Dr. P. Dhanraj, CASR, Madras Institute of Technology, Chromepet. It carries an amateur radio and technology demonstration experiments. It was successfully Integrated at the clean room facility at MIT, Chrompet, Chennai and launched aboard a PSLV-CA designated PSLV-C12, along with RISAT-2, from the Second Launch Pad at the Satish Dhawan Space Centre. The launch was carried out at 01:15 GMT (06:45 IST) on 20 April 2009.

The satellite's development was sponsored by the Indian Space Research Organisation, who were also responsible for launch services.

It carried an amateur radio store and forward communications system, and also conducted technological research. This satellite was spin stabilized and spin axis is pointed normal towards the sun. The satellite was integrated and tested at MICSAT, the MIT Chromepet clean room.

As on January 9, 2012, ANUSAT completed 15287 orbits around the earth thereby exceeding its intended mission life of two years.

References

http://mitindia.edu/en/phd-research/electronics
http://mitindia.edu/en/103-mitindia/departments/aerospace/aero-staff/438-prof-r-dhanaraj

External links
AIAA IEEE Research article
ANUSAT Webpage

Student satellites
Students in India
Spacecraft launched in 2009
Spacecraft which reentered in 2012
Satellites of India
Amateur radio satellites
2009 in India